MNBA may refer to:
 2-Methyl-6-nitrobenzoic anhydride, a condensing agent used in chemistry laboratories
 Mongolian National Basketball Association, sponsored by Spalding
 Museo Nacional de Bellas Artes (disambiguation), several institutions